The Somali Ambassador in Washington, D. C. is the official representative of the Government of in Mogadishu to the Government of the United States and Permanent Representative next the Headquarters of the United Nations.

List of representatives 

United States–Somalia relations

References 

 
United States
Somalia